The PAF XT-001 Marko 1 was a basic trainer aircraft developed by the Philippine Air Force Self-Reliance Development Wing (PAFSRDW).

Design and development
It was designed and built by the Self-Reliance Development Wing of the Philippine Air Force in 1975 from locally designed jigs and fixtures. It closely resembles the SIAI-Marchetti SF.260MP trainer, but with modified wingtips and cockpit. The prototype was initially thought to be a modified SF.260MP. Comparison of data with those for the SF.260MP indicates a slight increase in wingspan (though not in gross wing area), a lower empty weight, and (despite a similar powerplant and identical maximum takeoff weight) a slightly reduced performance. The first test flight was on May 21, 1975.

Operators

 Philippine Air Force

Specifications

See also

References

Aircraft manufactured in the Philippines
Philippine Air Force